Red Leaf Records was founded in January 1965 by independent Canadian record producers Duff Roman and Danny Mostoway (Roman Records), Art Snider and David Pears (Chateau, Canatal, ACT) and Stan Klees (Tamarac, Bigland),. Believing that radio stations, record dealers and consumers had become confused by the profusion of small labels whose releases were few and far between and scantily promoted and advertised, Red Leaf's founders retired their own labels to join forces in a national super-independent  Each unit operated independent of each other, but capitalized on the identity of a larger, cohesive organization.   The next year (1966) the label won the Juno Gold Leaf award for "Canadian Content Company".

Beginning in early 1965, Red Leaf released records by a wide array of artists, including rock and pop acts like The Paupers David Clayton Thomas and Bobby Vann from Toronto, The Characters from Ottawa and The British Modbeats from St. Catharines.  Other releases featured soul singers Shirley Matthews and Jay Jackson, girl groups like The Allan Sisters and The Charmaines, the country duo The Rainvilles, novelty records by The Teenyboppers and radio jock Dave Mickey, and even a Christmas 45.  The label released two LP's and about three dozen singles before dissolving in the late 1960s.

Discography

Albums

Singles

References

External links 
Biography of Stan Klees
History of Red Leaf artists The Paupers

Canadian independent record labels
Record labels established in 1965
Record labels disestablished in 1969